Louis-Jean-Nicolas Lejoille  (Saint-Valery-sur-Somme, 11 November 1759 – Brindisi, 9 April 1799 ) was a French Navy officer and captain.

Career 
Born to a family of sailors, Lejoille started sailing at seven as a boy on the merchantman commanded by his father. He then studied at Abbeville and Amiens before embarking as a helmsman on the fluyt Tamponne in 1776. In 1780, he joined the crew of the Degranbourg, a merchantman chartered by the Crown in Suffren's fleet, on which he took part in the Battle of Porto Praya. At the arrival at the Cape of Good Hope, Lejoille took command of Degranbourg while his father returned to France.

In 1783, Lejoille returned to the merchant navy. On 6 May 1793, he was appointed Lieutenant and given command of the 14-gun corvette Céleste, which he ferried to Toulon. On 14, an incident occurred between Céleste and the Danish brig Franc-Navire, under Captain Elepsem, that triggered an investigation by the National Convention. Hennequin states that while crossing, Céleste captured the British war-brig Shout, of 18 guns.

Arrived in Toulon, Lejoille was appointed to the Tonnant as first officer. He distinguished himself during the action of 8 June 1794 where the frigate Alceste was captured, and transferred on Alceste as her new captain. In 1795, he took part in the squadron under Admiral Martin, and was the first ship to overhaul and engage the 74-gun HMS Berwick at the action of 8 March 1795 where she was captured. A shot from Alceste having decapitated Berwick 's captain Adam Littlejohn, Lejoille was credited with much of the merit of the capture, and granted command of the prize. However, severely wounded at the right arm and leg, he was transferred to the flagship and convalesced in Genoa for eight months.

Promoted to Chef de Division during his convalescence, Lejoille was first sent to Venice to oversee commissionings of the ships captured in the harbour, and then transferred to Corfu to take command of the 74-gun Généreux, in Brueys' squadron. He took part in the Battle of the Nile at the rear of the French line, duelling with HMS Bellerophon. His men inflicted heavy damage on the Bellerophon, but were damaged themselves in turn and eventually fled from the battlefield.

Near Crete, Généreux met with HMS Leander, which she captured in the action of 18 August 1798. The British officers were released on parole.

British sources later accused the French crew and Lejoille himself of plunder and various war crimes; the French captain who ferried the paroled officers of Leander to Trieste attacked the charges, and in his  Batailles navales de la France, Troude accuses William James of further "augmenting" the accusations originally published in the Gazette de Vienne. Léon Guérin claims that the accusations stem entirely from the Life of Nelson and that it furthermore fabricated a report by Lejoille.

During the Siege of Corfu, Lejoille led Généreux to assist General Chabot and to harass the Russian blockade. As the situation of Corfu became more critical, Lejoille decided to organise a relief operation: he sailed to Ancona with Généreux and the brig Rivoli, where he loaded a 1000-man force, along with ammunition and food. One month later, he sailed back to Corfu.

Awaiting a reconnaissance of Corfu, Lejoille decided to moor his ships in Brindisi harbour. In order to do so, he intended to sail past the fort defending the entrance channel without firing and attack it from behind. However, a navigation error grounded Généreux under the fort, forcing Lejoille to accept a gunnery duel. Lejoille was killed in the subsequent exchange of fire.

Captain Touffet replaced Lejoille, and the fort and city of Brindisi surrendered after a two-hour battle. Généreux was refloated and awaited news from Corfu, which had in fact fallen on 3 March 1799; when informed, she put to sail and returned to Ancona. A xebec captured near Livorno was named Lejoille in his honour in March 1799.

Sources and references

Notes

References

Bibliography 

 
 
 
 
 

 Fonds Marine. Campagnes (opérations ; divisions et stations navales ; missions diverses). Inventaire de la sous-série Marine BB4. Tome premier : BB4 1 à 482 (1790-1826) 

1759 births
1799 deaths
People from Somme (department)
French Navy officers
French military personnel of the French Revolutionary Wars
French naval commanders of the Napoleonic Wars
French military personnel killed in the Napoleonic Wars